Cold Moon can refer to:

 Cold Moon (1991 film)
 Cold Moon (2016 film)